Deitra Farr (born August 1, 1957) is an American blues, soul and gospel singer-songwriter.

Life and career
She was born in Chicago, Illinois, United States, and Farr began singing in the mid-1970s with various soul bands. Deitra graduated from Kenwood High School (Academy) in Chicago. She studied vocal music there with Lena McLin and was a member of the Kenwood Choir. At the age of 18, Farr recorded the lead vocals on "You Won't Support Me", with the Chicago group Mill Street Depo. That song made the Top 100 R&B list with Cashbox magazine. She began singing the blues in the early 1980s. From 1993 to 1996, she was the lead singer for Mississippi Heat and recorded two albums with them, Learned the Hard Way and Thunder in my Heart.

In 1997, she released her first solo album titled The Search is Over, on the British record label, JSP Records.
 
In 2005, Farr released her second JSP album, Let It Go. The blues guitarist, Billy Flynn, played on Let It Go.

Since 1990, she has toured internationally, so far performing in over 40 countries. Farr is a graduate of Columbia College Chicago, with a Bachelor's degree in journalism. She has a regular column called "Artist to Artist" in Living Blues magazine.

In October 2015, Farr was inducted into the Chicago Blues Hall of Fame as a "Legendary Blues Artist".

Deitra received  " The Koko Taylor Queen of the Blues Award" from the Jus Blues Music Foundation on August 3, 2017.

Discography

Singles
" You Won't Support Me" (1976) – lead vocals with Mill Street Depo – Stang/All Platinum Records

Solo albums
The Search is Over (1997) – JSP Records
Let It Go (2005) – JSP Records

Compilation and other albums
 Our Course has Run (1991) – Dave Spector – Bluebird Blues – Delmark Records
 Chicago Blues Nights (1991) – Various artists – GBW DIW/Tokyo Records
 Burnin Chicago Blues Machine (1991) – Various artists (duets) – GBW DIW/Tokyo Records
 My Ancestors (1991) – Chicago Beau – (duet and background vocals) – GBW DIW/Tokyo Records
 Vinir Dora (1993) –  Various artists – Straight Ahead Records
 Chicago's Finest Blues Women (1995) – Various artists – Wolf Records
 Learned the Hard Way (1994) – Mississippi Heat – Van Der Linden Records
 Thunder in My Heart (1995) – Mississippi Heat – Van Der Linden Records
 Undiscovered Gems (1998) – lead vocalist on "You Won't Support Me" – All Platinum Records
 Bop Brother's and Sister's (2000) – Jon T-Bone Taylor – duet on "Like a Fish" – Abacabe Records, London
 Shoulder to the Wind (2000) – Matthew Skoller Band – guest spot on "One More Flower" – Tongue 'N Groove Records
 I Believe in America (2002) – Various artists – lead vocals on "Homesick Blues" – Bradley House Records
 Bob is Back in Town (2006) – Bob Stroger – background vocals – Airway Records
 The Real Deal (2011) – Sharon Lewis – background vocals – Delmark Records
 Soul Gift (2012) – Raphael Wressnig and Alex Schultz -lead vocal on – " All That I've Got" and duet with Tad Robinson on " Ain't Nothing Like The Real Thing " – Pepper Cake Records
 Delta Bound (2012) – Mississippi Heat – lead vocals on "Look-A-Here, Baby","What's Happening to Me" and "Sweet Ol' Blues" – Delmark Records
 Blues from Below (2013) – Brother Jacob – duet and background vocals – Schulz Records
 Moodprints (2015) – Ruud DeVries – vocals on "Talk About Love" – JazzTracks Records
 Captured Live (2017) – Raphael Wressnig – vocals on "All That I've Got" – Pepper Cake Records
 Lonesome Highway (2017) – Billy Flynn – duet on "Good Navigator" and "Hold On" – Delmark Records
 Soul Santa (2017) – Mr. Keith Little – duet on "A Christmas Party" and "Too Many Baby Daddy's"
 Doin' What I'm Supposed to Do (2022) – Demetria Taylor – duet on "Blues Early This Morning" - Delmark Records

References

Bibliography
Today's Chicago Blues, Karen Hanson, Lake Claremont Press, 2007, 
Exploring Chicago Blues, Rosalind Cummings-Yeates, The History Press, 2014,

External links
Deitra Farr's Homepage

1957 births
Living people
American blues singers
American women singer-songwriters
American blues singer-songwriters
Soul-blues musicians
Electric blues musicians
Singers from Chicago
JSP Records artists
Singer-songwriters from Illinois
21st-century American women